Bachelor's Paradise is a 1928 American silent drama film directed by George Archainbaud and starring Sally O'Neil, Ralph Graves and Eddie Gribbon.

Cast
 Sally O'Neil as Sally O'Day 
 Ralph Graves as Joe Wallace 
 Eddie Gribbon as Terry Malone 
 James Finlayson as Pat Malone 
 Sylvia Ashton as Mrs. Malone 
 Jean Laverty as Gladys O'Toole

References

Bibliography
 Munden, Kenneth White. The American Film Institute Catalog of Motion Pictures Produced in the United States, Part 1. University of California Press, 1997.

External links
 

1928 films
1928 drama films
1920s English-language films
American silent feature films
Silent American drama films
Films directed by George Archainbaud
American black-and-white films
Tiffany Pictures films
1920s American films